Sanati Kaveh Tehran F.C. was an Iranian football, club was based in Tehran, Iran. They mostly competed in the Iranian first division, and hold home games at Aliaf Stadium.
In 2012 Yadavaran Shalamcheh Hamyari took over the license.

Seasons
The table below chronicles the achievements of Sanati Kaveh  in various competitions since 2008.

Head coaches
 Ahmad Khodadad (2008 – Mar 10)
 Hossein Faraki (Mar 2010 – July 10)
 Javad Zarrincheh (July 10 – February 11)
 Farhad Kazemi (February 11 – ?)
 Ali Nikbakht (2011)
 Saket Elhami (2011)
 Majid Namjoo-Motlagh (December 2011 – 2012)

References

External links
  Official Farhad Kazemi Website
  Players and Results
 footballiran.ir

Football clubs in Tehran
Association football clubs established in 2008
2008 establishments in Iran
2012 disestablishments in Iran
Association football clubs disestablished in 2012